The New Lots Avenue station is an elevated station on the BMT Canarsie Line of the New York City Subway. Located at the intersection of New Lots and Van Sinderen Avenues at the border of Brownsville and East New York, Brooklyn, it is served by the L train at all times.

History 
This station opened on July 28, 1906.

The Canarsie-bound platform was closed for renovation from December 2, 1963 to April 2, 1964, and the Manhattan-bound platform was closed for renovation from April 2 to July 23, 1964. The entire project cost $214,700. As part of the project the wooden platforms were replaced with concrete platforms, and canopies and fluorescent lights were installed.

The station was renovated again in 2006-2007 at a cost of $10.58 million. The station renovation included the installation of new platform edges with yellow tactile warning strips, beige windscreens and red canopies (both with green frames), and the installation of artwork.

Station layout

This elevated station has two tracks and two offset side platforms. The platforms have windscreens and canopies at their centers and woven-wire fences with dark gray steel frames at either ends.

This station's 2007 artwork is called 16 Windows by Eugene Tung. It features eight stained glass windows on each platform windscreen. The ones on the Manhattan-bound platform depict people doing morning activities like eating breakfast and tooth brushing while those on the Canarsie-bound platform depict people doing evening activities like eating dinner and getting ready for bed. This coincides with normal peak direction rush hour service in the subway as most people board trains on the northbound platform going to Manhattan in the morning and disembark from trains on the southbound platform coming from Manhattan in the evening.

To the south, the Canarsie Line lowers to run at-grade to East 105th Street and Canarsie–Rockaway Parkway. To the north, it becomes an elevated structure to Livonia Avenue until just west of Broadway Junction.

Exit
The station's only entrance is via a ground-level station house beneath the tracks on the southwest corner of Van Sinderen and New Lots Avenues. Inside is a token booth, turnstile bank, and two staircases to the Canarsie-bound platform and one to the Manhattan-bound one, all at their centers.

References

External links 

 
 Station Reporter — L Train
 The Subway Nut — New Lots Avenue Pictures
 MTA's Arts For Transit — New Lots Avenue (BMT Canarsie Line)
 New Lots Avenue entrance from Google Maps Street View
 Platforms from Google Maps Street View

BMT Canarsie Line stations
New York City Subway stations in Brooklyn
Railway stations in the United States opened in 1906
1906 establishments in New York City
Brownsville, Brooklyn
East New York, Brooklyn